The Midland Park School District is a comprehensive community public school district serving students in pre-kindergarten through twelfth grade from Midland Park, in Bergen County, New Jersey, United States.

As of the 2018–19 school year, the district, comprising three schools, had an enrollment of 943 students and 99.1 classroom teachers (on an FTE basis), for a student–teacher ratio of 9.5:1.

The district is classified by the New Jersey Department of Education as being in District Factor Group "GH", the third-highest of eight groupings. District Factor Groups organize districts statewide to allow comparison by common socioeconomic characteristics of the local districts. From lowest socioeconomic status to highest, the categories are A, B, CD, DE, FG, GH, I and J.

Awards and recognition
For the 2000-01 school year, Highland-Godwin Elementary School was named a "Star School" by the New Jersey Department of Education, the highest honor that a New Jersey school can achieve.

Schools
Schools in the district (with 2018–19 enrollment data from the National Center for Education Statistics) are:
Godwin School with 249 students in grades PreK-2
Danielle Bache, Principal
Highland School with 267 students in grades 3-6
Peter Galasso, Principal
Midland Park High School with 398 students in grades 7-12
Nicholas Capuano, Principal

Administration
Core members of the district's administration are:
Dr. Marie Cirasella, Superintendent
Stacy C. Garvey, Business Administrator / Board Secretary

Board of Education
The district's board of education, comprised of nine members, sets policy and oversees the fiscal and educational operation of the district through its administration. As a Type II school district, the board's trustees are elected directly by voters to serve three-year terms of office on a staggered basis, with three seats up for election each year held (since 2015) as part of the November general election. The board appoints a superintendent to oversee the district's day-to-day operations and a business administrator to supervise the business functions of the district.

References

External links
Midland Park School District

School Data for the Midland Park School District, National Center for Education Statistics

Midland Park, New Jersey
School districts in Bergen County, New Jersey
New Jersey District Factor Group GH